Colchicum pusillum is a species of perennial flowering plant in the family Colchicaceae that is easily identified by its up to 6 narrow (2mm or 1/16") leaves produced during or shortly after flowering.  The flowers are star shaped and pale pink in colour.  Its native region is Crete, Greece and Cyprus.

References

pusillum
Plants described in 1822
Flora of Crete
Flora of Greece
Flora of Cyprus